Ojo Sarco is an unincorporated community located in Rio Arriba County, New Mexico, United States. Ojo Sarco had its own post office until June 8, 1996.

Demographics

Education
The southern portion is in Peñasco Independent Schools while the northern portion is in Española Public Schools. The comprehensive public high school for the Española district is Española Valley High School.

References

Unincorporated communities in Rio Arriba County, New Mexico
Unincorporated communities in New Mexico